The ongoing communist rebellion in the Philippines is a conflict between the government of the Philippines and the New People's Army (NPA), which is the armed wing of the Marxist–Leninist–Maoist Communist Party of the Philippines (CPP). The conflict is also associated with the National Democratic Front of the Philippines (NDFP), which serves as the legal wing of the CPP.

The history of the rebellion can be traced back to March 29, 1969, when Jose Maria Sison's newly formed CPP entered an alliance with a small armed group led by Bernabe Buscayno. Buscayno's group, which was originally a unit under the Marxist–Leninist 1930s-era Partido Komunista ng Pilipinas-1930 (PKP-1930), was renamed the New People's Army (NPA) and became the armed wing of the CPP. Less than two years later, President Ferdinand Marcos introduced martial law, leading to the radicalization of many young people and a rapid growth of the CPP-NPA.

In 1992, the NPA split into two factions: the reaffirmist faction, led by Sison, and the rejectionist faction, which advocated the formation of larger military units and urban insurgencies. Thirteen smaller factions eventually emerged from the group. Until 2002, the NPA received a considerable amount of aid from outside the Philippines, although later developments forced it to rely more on support from local sources.

The CPP-NPA rebellion is the world's longest ongoing communist insurgency and is the largest, most prominent communist conflict in the Philippines, in contrast to the 1995–present Marxist–Leninist Revolutionary Workers' Party rebellion and the now-defunct 1942–1954 Hukbalahap and 1986–2011 Cordillera People's Liberation Army rebellions. Between 1969 and 2008, more than 43,000 insurgency-related fatalities were recorded. Another rebellion is that of the Marxist–Leninist Party of the Philippines and its armed wing, the Rebolusyonaryong Hukbong Bayan (RHB), which broke away from the Communist Party of the Philippines in 1998 and has since been in conflict with both the government and the CPP.

The year 2022 was marked with the deaths of Sison and the husband-and-wife duo of Benito and Wilma Tiamzon, the former being the alleged leader of the NPA.

Background

Formation of the Communist Party of the Philippines

The original Partido Komunista ng Pilipinas-1930 (PKP) was established in 1930 by members of the Partido Obrero de Filipinas and the Socialist Party of the Philippines with the help of the COMINTERN. It would later lead an anti-Japanese Hukbalahap Rebellion in 1942 with the Hukbo ng Bayan Laban sa Hapon. During World War II, these communist guerrillas fought against both the Japanese and other guerrilla bands. In the years following, Maoist factions began organizing mass organizations such as Kabataang Makabayan, Malayang Kilusan ng Kababaihan and hosting theoretical studies on Marxism–Leninism–Maoism. They would eventually break off from the old party and form the Communist Party of the Philippines/Marxist–Leninist–Maoist in 1968.

Founding of the New People's Army

The New People's Army would be established by Jose Maria Sison and Bernabe Buscayno as the armed wing of the CPP-MLM. The new Maoist leadership would drop the reformist ideas that led the CPP-1930 to collaborate with the government of Ferdinand Marcos, and enforce Maoist principles, aimed at creating a socialist state through New Democracy by launching a people's war. Its initial strength was estimated to compromise approximately 60 guerrillas and 35 weapons.

Establishment of the National Democratic Front

The National Democratic Front was established in 1973 as the political front of the CPP-MLM, bringing together broad revolutionary organizations which accepted their 12-point program, and building international relations with foreign communist parties such as the Communist Party of India (Maoist) and Communist Party of Nepal (Maoist).

Insurgency

Formative years of the NPA (1969 - 1972)

Initial strength and tactics
When Buscayno's forces became the NPA in 1969, they were reported to have only 60 guerrillas and 35 WWII-era guns.

At first, the NPA tried to follow the Maoist military doctrine of "establishing stable base areas," but this was abandoned when their forces took heavy casualties in Northern Luzon, in favor of dispersing their forces.

The NPA's stockpile of weaponry allegedly grew to 60 guns, but all 60 of these guns were lost in an encounter against the Armed Forces of the Philippines, and they were not able to regain firepower until the defection of Lt. Victor Corpus and the December 29, 1970 PMA Armory Raid.

Even on September 23, 1972, when Martial Law was announced, the Philippine National Security Council didn't see the NPA as a big threat. Just a few days earlier on September 19, 1972, the council's threat assessment was "between 'normal' and 'Internal Defense Condition 1'," where the highest condition "3." One of the generals serving under General Fabian Ver of the National Intelligence and Security Authority later recalled that "Even when Martial Law was declared, the communists were not a real threat. The military could handle them."

Mythologization by the Marcos administration
Despite the small size of the NPA at the time, the Marcos administration hyped up its formation, supposedly because this would help build up political and monetary support from the US, which was caught up in red scare paranoia at the time. As a result, as security specialist Richard J. Kessler notes, the administration "mythologized the group, investing it with a revolutionary aura that only attracted more supporters."

December 1970 PMA Armory Raid
The NPA was finally able to regain weaponry on December 29, 1970, when Philippine Military Academy instructor Lt. Victor Corpus defected to the CPP-NPA and led a raid on the PMA armory, timing the raid when most cadets were out on Christmas vacation and the PMA's senior officers including its superintendent, General Ugalde, had left the camp to meet President Ferdinand Marcos upon his scheduled arrival in nearby Baguio City. Corpus, who was PMA's designated officer of the day (OOD), guided the NPA raiding team which managed to escape with Browning automatic rifles, carbines, machine guns, and various other weapons and ammunition.

First incidents of violence
According to now retired Brig. General Victor Corpus, the first act of NPA rebellion took place on August 21, 1971, when NPA militants allegedly threw three grenades onto the stage at a Liberal Party rally in Manila, killing nine people and injuring 95 others. This, however, is disputed by most historians, who blamed President Ferdinand Marcos as the perpetrator of the bombing. José María Sison and the Communist Party of the Philippines continued to deny responsibility of the bombing. However, historian Joseph Scalice argues that while the Marcos government was allied with the Partido Komunista ng Pilipinas (PKP) in carrying out bombings in the early 1970s, "the evidence of history now overwhelmingly suggests that the Communist Party of the Philippines, despite being allied with the Liberal Party, was responsible for this bombing, seeing it as a means of facilitating repression which they argued would hasten revolution." Relying on small armed community-based propaganda units, the NPA found itself in an all-out rebellion by 1972.

The NPA's first tactical operation, however, would not take place until 1974, two years after Ferdinand Marcos declared Martial Law. This took place in Calbiga, Samar, where the NPA ambushed an Army scout patrol and seized a number of their weapons.

Rapid growth of the NPA under the Marcos martial law era (1972-1986)

The Communist Party of the Philippines underwent rapid growth from 1972 during the period of martial law under Ferdinand Marcos.

The social unrest of 1969 to 1970, and the violent dispersal of the resulting "First Quarter Storm" protests were among the early watershed events in which large numbers of Filipino students of the 1970s were radicalized against the Marcos administration. Due to these dispersals, many students who had previously held "moderate" positions (i.e., calling for legislative reforms) became convinced that they had no choice but to call for more radical social change.

Other watershed events that would later radicalize many otherwise "moderate" opposition members include the February 1971 Diliman Commune; the August 1971 suspension of the writ of habeas corpus in the wake of the Plaza Miranda bombing; the September 1972 declaration of Martial Law; the 1980 murder of Macli-ing Dulag; and the August 1983 assassination of Ninoy Aquino.

This radicalization led to a significant growth of the CPP and of the New People's Army under the Marcos administration. Writer and peace advocate Gus Miclat cites the example of Mindanao: "There was not one NPA cadre in Mindanao in 1972. Yes, there were activists, there were some firebrands... but there were no armed rebels then except for those that eventually formed the Moro National Liberation Front. When Marcos fled in 1986, the NPA was virtually in all Mindanao provinces, enjoying even a tacit alliance with the MNLF."

The parallel Moro insurgency created favorable conditions for the development of NPA. During the 1970s, 75% of the Philippine military was deployed on the island of Mindanao, a Moro stronghold, despite the 1976 peace deal between the government and MILF. As of 2000, 40% of the AFP troops continued to engage Moro rebels.

Support to the NPA from other countries
China provided support to the NPA from 1969 to 1976. After that period, the Chinese ceased all aid, resulting in a five-year period of reduced activity. Despite the setback, the rebellion rekindled with funds from revolutionary taxes, extortion and large scale foreign support campaigns. Besides extortion, the NPA has also conducted kidnappings of Filipino civilians and foreign businessmen as a source of funding. Both the CPP and NPA attempted to garner support from the Workers' Party of Korea, the Maoist factions of the Palestinian Liberation Organization, Japanese Red Army, Sandinista National Liberation Front, Communist Party of El Salvador, Communist Party of Peru, and the Algerian military. Financial aid, training, and other forms of support were received from a number of the above. NDF-controlled trading companies were allegedly set up in Hong Kong, Belgium, and Yugoslavia. At the same time the Communist Party of the Philippines formed a unit in the Netherlands and sent representatives to Germany, France, Italy, Greece, Ireland, United States, Sweden, and various parts of the Middle East. Despite the massive amount of aid previously received, foreign support eventually dried up following the 1990s collapse of socialist governments worldwide.

Formation of the CPLA and Mount Data Peace Accord (1986)

In 1986, the Cordillera People's Liberation Army was formed when the New People's Army unit led by former priest Conrado Balweg broke away from the New People's Army, accusing the latter of incompetence in pursuing its goals. The splinter group's new stated goal was to fight for autonomy for the people of the Cordillera.

Shortly after Ferdinand Marcos was ousted by the People Power Revolution, the CPLA made a "sipat" or ceasefire with the newly-established Provisional Government of the Philippines at the Mt. Data Hotel, in Bauko, Mountain Province on September 13, 1986. The agreement between the two sides was called the 1986 Mount Data Peace Accord.

NPA incidents during the Corazon Aquino administration (1986–1992)

Release of Political Prisoners and "resurfacing" of activists
After Ferdinand Marcos was deposed during the 1986 EDSA Revolution, president Corazon Aquino ordered the release of political prisoners, including Jose Maria Sison and Bernabe Buscayno. Buscayno ceased activities related to the CPP-NPA while Sison eventually went into self-exile in the Netherlands, ostensibly to become chief political consultant to the NDF. Many activists who had joined the underground movement against Marcos chose to "resurface."

Mendiola massacre and cessation of peace talks

Preliminary peace talks were held between the new administration and the CPP–NPA–NDF, but these ended when the Mendiola massacre took place on January 22, 1987. This effectively ended dialogue between the CPP–NPA–NDF throughout the rest of Corazon Aquino's administration.

NPA incidents during the Ramos administration (1992–1998)

1992 reaffirmist/rejectionist split

Between the 1970s and 1980s, thousands of volunteers, including youth and teenagers from both urban and rural areas, joined the organization. In 1992, NPA split into two factions: the reaffirmist faction led by Sison and the rejectionist faction which advocated the formation of larger military units and urban insurgencies. Through NPA's history, 13 smaller factions emerged from the group, the most notable being MLPP-RHB, APP, RPA-M, RPM/P-RPA-ABB and CPLA.

This split resulted in a weakening of the CPP-NPA, but it gradually grew again after the breakdown of peace talks in 1998, the unpopularity of the Estrada administration, and because of social pressures arising from the Asian Financial Crisis that year.

Repeal of the 1957 Anti-Subversion Act
A breakthrough in the peace process between the Government of the Philippines and the Communist Party of the Philippines took place on October 11, 1992, when Republic Act (RA) 1700 – the 1957 Anti-Subversion Act – was repealed by RA 7636 and the government declared a policy of amnesty and reconciliation. This was quickly followed by the Hague Joint Declaration of September 1, 1992, in which the Government of the Philippines and the Communist Party of the Philippines (through the National Democratic Front) agreed to work towards formal negotiations and "a just and lasting peace."

1995 JASIG and 1998 CARHRIHL agreements
In 1995, negotiations led to the signing of the Joint Agreement on Safety and Immunity Guarantees (JASIG), under which negotiators on either side of the conflict were assured of "free and safe movement—without fear of search, surveillance, or arrest."

In 1998, another agreement, the Comprehensive Agreement to Respect Human Rights and International Humanitarian Law (CARHRIHL) was signed in an effort to protect civilians from the violence between the two parties.

Formation of the RPA-ABB (1996)

Due to the ideological split known as the Second Great Rectification Movement, the Negros Regional Party Committee of the New People's Army broke away from the Communist Party of the Philippines in 1996 and formed the Rebolusyonaryong Partido ng Manggagawà ng Pilipinas ("Revolutionary Workers' Party of the Philippines"). It organized its military arm two months after the split, calling it the Revolutionary Proletarian Army.

The Metro Manila-based Alex Boncayao Brigade, which also broke away from the New People's Army, allied itself with the RPA the year after, forming the Revolutionary Proletarian Army – Alex Boncayao Brigade (RPA-ABB).

Formation of the MLPP-RHB (1998)

In 1998, a group which operates mainly in Central Luzon broke away from the Communist Party of the Philippines, taking up a Marxist-Leninist ideology instead of the CPP's Marxism-Leninism-Maoism. This became the Marxist–Leninist Party of the Philippines which soon initiated conflict with the Philippine government through its armed wing, the Rebolusyonaryong Hukbong Bayan (RHB).

The conflict is still ongoing,
 although incidents covered in the media focus more on incidents arising from the rivalry between RHB and NPA.

NPA incidents during the Estrada administration (1998–2001)
The peace talks broke down soon after the 1998 agreement, however, and conflict between the two parties resumed at high levels after Joseph Estrada assumed the presidency later that year. In March 2001, a few months after Estrada was ousted by the "EDSA II" Revolution, National Security Advisor Roilo Golez noted that the number of "barangays influenced by" the CPP-NPA grew from 772 barangays 1,279 under the Estrada administration, which Golez added was "quite a big jump." In July 2001, officials of the Armed Forces of the Philippines noted that the NPA grew in strength "at an average of three to five percent yearly" since 1998.

NPA incidents during the Arroyo administration (2001-2010 )
In 2001, the AFP launched a campaign of selective extrajudicial killings, in an attempt to suppress NPA activity. By targeting suspected rebel sympathizers, the campaign aimed to destroy the communist political infrastructure. The program was modeled after the Phoenix Program, a U.S. project implemented during the Vietnam War. According to Dr William Norman Holden, University of Calgary, security forces carried out a total of 1,335 extrajudicial killings between January 2001 – October 2012.

On August 9, 2002, NPA was designated a Foreign Terrorist Organization (FTO) by the United States Department of State. A parallel increase in counter-insurgency operations negatively affected the course of the rebellion. Netherlands-based Jose Maria Sison is currently the leader of CPP's eight member politburo and 26 member central committee—the party's highest ruling bodies. Despite the existence of the politburo, NPA's local units receive a high level of autonomy due to difficulties in communication between each of the fronts across the country.

Rebel recruits receive combat training from veteran fighters and ideological training by Mao Zedong in: the Three Main Rules of Discipline and Eight Points of Attention; the Comprehensive Agreement to Respect Human Rights and International Humanitarian Law. NPA units usually consist of 15–30 fighters, with special armed partisan units of 50–60 rebels serving in a special operations capacity. NPA also formed a limited tactical alliance with the Moro National Liberation Front and the Moro Islamic Liberation Front on the island of Mindanao, enabling the mutual transfer of troops through each other's territory. Between 1969 and 2008, more than 43,000 insurgency-related fatalities were recorded.

Plantations run by Japanese companies have been assaulted by the NPA.

NPA incidents during the Benigno Aquino III administration (2010-2016)

Several efforts to move forward with peace talks between the Government of the Philippines and the CPP, NDFP, and NPA were initiated throughout the administration of President Benigno Aquino III, with the government of the Kingdom of Norway providing support to the peace negotiations as a third-party facilitator.

NPA incidents during the Duterte administration (2016-2022)
In the State of the Nation Address by President Rodrigo Duterte which happened in July 2016, Duterte declared a unilateral ceasefire to the leftist rebels. Due to this declaration, the peace talks between the government and the NDF resumed in August 2016. The peace talks were carried out in Oslo, Norway.

In February 2017, the CPP–NPA–NDF declared that it would withdraw from the ceasefire, effective on February 10, 2017, due to the unfulfilled promise by the government that it would release all 392 political prisoners. After the communists killed three of their soldiers, the government also withdrew from the ceasefire. The peace talks were informally terminated and an all-out war was declared by the AFP.

In March 2017, the government announced a new truce and the resumption of peace talks, to take place in April. The fifth round was planned to take place in June.

However, on December 5, 2017, President Rodrigo Duterte declared the CPP and NPA as terrorist organizations after several attacks by the NPA against the government. The NDFP, the political wing of the communist rebellion was not included on the proclamation.

In order to centralize all government efforts for the reintegration of former communist rebels, President Duterte signed Administrative Order No. 10 on April 3, 2018, creating the Task Force Balik Loob which was placed in charge in centralizing the Enhanced Comprehensive Local Integration Program (E-CLIP) of the Department of the Interior and Local Government (DILG), and the Payapa at Masaganang Pamayanan (PAMANA) program of the Office of the Presidential Adviser on the Peace Process (OPAPP). As of December 30, 2019, the Task Force reported over 10,000 former CPP-NPA rebels and supporters who have returned to the fold of the law and availed of E-CLIP benefits, which include PHP65,000.00 cash assistance, livelihood training, housing benefits, among others.

On December 4, 2018, President Rodrigo Duterte signed Executive Order No. 70, which institutionalized a "whole-of-nation approach" in attaining an "inclusive and sustainable peace" to help end the decades-long communist insurgency, while also forming the National Task Force to End Local Communist Armed Conflict (NTF-ELCAC) which was directed to ensure the efficient and effective implementation of the approach. This order further intensified the Philippine government's campaign against the insurgency, with the Armed Forces of the Philippines reporting 11,605 rebels and supporters surrendering to the government, with 120 rebels being killed and 196 more arrested in military operations from January 1 to December 26, 2018.

Incidents in specific regions and provinces

Samar
Since the early stages of the rebellion, the island of Samar has been considered to be NPA's main stronghold. While Samar represents 2% and 4.47% of the Philippine population and territory respectively, 11% of all NPA related incidents have taken place on the island. Samar's terrain consists of densely forested mountainous areas, providing fertile ground for the conduct of guerrilla warfare.

An important factor in the spread of the rebellion was the issue of widespread landlessness. Land reforms provided only a limited solution for the millions of Philippine landless farmers. In the case of Samar, 40 landowning clans controlled approximately half of the island's agricultural land. Instances of landowner harassment and violence towards working class tenants led to escalating tensions between the two social groups.

Another factor into the Samar Island being a stronghold is historically the island has been among the most rebellious against the American Commonwealth rule, Spanish rule, and the Japanese occupation.

In 1976, NPA gained popular support among the inhabitants of Samar following vigilante actions against cattle rustling gangs. The following year, NPA transferred agents from Cebu and Manila where conditions were less favorable. The influx of troops enabled the NPA to form units fully engaged in guerrilla activities. In 1982, an unofficial communist government was formed, solidifying Samar as a communist stronghold. The 1980s downfall of the coconut industry greatly affected the livelihoods of many Samaranos, further fueling the rebellion. Between January 2011 and December 2012, a total of 153 insurgency-related incidents took place in Samar, resulting in 21 deaths and 55 injuries.

Mindanao
Prior to Ferdinand Marcos's September 23, 1972, announcement of Martial Law, the NPA did not have a presence in Mindanao, which was also only seeing the beginnings of the Moro separatist conflict in the form of clashes between the Ilaga and Blackshirt ethnic militias. Marcos's enforcement of martial law radicalized this situation until, as peace advocate Gus Miclat notes: "When Marcos fled in 1986, the NPA was virtually in all Mindanao provinces, enjoying even a tacit alliance with the MNLF."

Peace talks
Based on the records of the Office of the Presidential Adviser on the Peace Process, the Government of the Philippines and the CPP–NPA–NDF had engaged in over 40 rounds of peace talks by November 2017.

See also
Timeline of the communist rebellion in the Philippines
Maoism
Political killings in the Philippines (2001–2010)

References

Communist armed conflicts in the Philippines
Communist rebellions
20th-century conflicts
21st-century conflicts
History of the Philippines (1965–1986)
History of the Philippines (1986–present)
Maoism in the Philippines
Military history of the Philippines
Proxy wars
Wars involving the Philippines